Antoine Balpêtré (3 May 1898 – 28 March 1963) was a French stage and film actor. He appeared in more than 50 films between 1933 and 1963.

Partial filmography

 The Agony of the Eagles (1933) - Le commandant Thiéry
 The House of Mystery (1933) - Rudeberg
 Gaspard de Besse (1935) - Cabasse
 Le monde tremblera (1939)
 Le duel (1941) - Le constructeur Bugnet
 The Murderer Lives at Number 21 (1942) - Albert, le ministre de l'Intérieur (uncredited)
 Picpus (1943) - Le grand patron
 La Main du diable (1943) - Denis
 Le Corbeau (1943) - Le docteur Delorme
 Le visiteur (1946) - Louberger
 Fort de la solitude (1948) - Le commissaire
 La figure de proue (1948) - Le père Morfouage
 Paysans noirs (1948) - Le médecin
 Fantomas Against Fantomas (1949) - Le président du conseil
 Suzanne and the Robbers (1949) - Bevardel
 Le paradis des pilotes perdus (1949) - Révérend-Père Spach
 Millionaires for One Day (1949) - Toubib
 Summer Storm (1949) - M. Arbelot
 Plus de vacances pour le Bon Dieu (1950) - L'inspecteur de police
 Justice Is Done (1950) - Le président du tribunal
 God Needs Men (1950) - Le père Gourvennec, un pêcheur
 Diary of a Country Priest (1951) - Dr. Delbende (Docteur Delbende)
 Beautiful Love (1951) - M. Moulin père
 Le Plaisir (1952) - Monsieur Poulain - L'ancien maire (segment "La Maison Tellier")
 We Are All Murderers (1952) - Dr. Albert Dutoit
 Son of the Hunchback (1952) - Pérolle
 The Road to Damascus (1952) - Gamaliel
 Alarm in Morocco (1953) - Le juge
 Tempest in the Flesh (1954) - Sébastien
 Stain in the Snow (1954) - Holtz
 Before the Deluge (1954) - Monsieur Albert Dutoit
 Adam Is Eve (1954) - Dr. Charman
 Mourez, nous ferons le reste (1954) - Le maire
 The Red and the Black (1954) - L'abbé Pirard
 House of Ricordi (1954) - Dottor Fleury (uncredited)
 A Free Woman (1954) - Collega di Liana (uncredited)
 Black Dossier (1955) - Dutoit
 Il piccolo vetraio (1955) - Neroni
 If Paris Were Told to Us (1956) - Verlaine
 The Case of Doctor Laurent (1957) - Docteur René Vanolli
 I Vampiri (1957) - Professor Julien du Grand
 Arènes joyeuses (1958) - Le clochard
 Ce corps tant désiré (1959) - M. Messardier
 Magnificent Sinner (1959) - Kilbatchich
 A Mistress for the Summer (1960) - Le poète
 The Hands of Orlac (1960) - (uncredited)
 The President (1961) - Un ministre (uncredited)
 Le cave se rebiffe (1961) - Lucas Malvoisin
 The Burning Court (1962) - Dr. Hermann
 Axel Munthe, The Doctor of San Michele (1962) - Leblanc
 La salamandre d'or (1962) - L'évêque
 Mathias Sandorf (1963) - Professor Ernst Bathory
 L'espionne sera à Nouméa (1963)

References

External links

1898 births
1963 deaths
French male film actors
French male stage actors
Male actors from Lyon
Sociétaires of the Comédie-Française
20th-century French male actors